Deborah Sturdy  is a British nurse and professor. She is the Government of the United Kingdom Chief Nurse for Social Care. She was awarded an Order of the British Empire in 2017 and made a Commander of the British Empire in 2023.

Career 
When Sturdy was awarded the British Geriatric Society Presidents Medal in 2011, she was the first ever nurse to receive such an honour. From February 2020, Sturdy worked as an advisor on social care to the Chief Nursing Officer. In December 2020 she was announced the UK's first Chief Nurse for Adult Social Care. During the COVID-19 pandemic, this role looked to transform the experiences of the 430,000 UK people living in care homes. She looked to champion the interests of social care nurses to government, and provide leadership to the workforce. The post was made permnanet in September 2021. In 2022 she launched the Adult Social Care Awards.

Awards and honours 

 2011 British Geriatric Society Presidents Medal 
 2015 Nurse Leaders Award
 2017 Order of the British Empire in the New Year Honours List
 2018 Fellow of the Queen’s Nursing Institute
 2019 Fellow of the Royal College of Nursing

Select publications

References 

Living people
British nurses
British women nurses
Year of birth missing (living people)
Fellows of the Royal College of Nursing
Commanders of the Order of the British Empire